Fred Roche was an Australian racing cyclist. He won the Australian national road race title in 1959 and 1960.

References

External links
 

Year of birth missing (living people)
Possibly living people
Australian male cyclists
Place of birth missing (living people)